Marshallia caespitosa, commonly called puffballs is a species of plant in the family Asteraceae that is native to the south-central United States.

It is a perennial that produces white to pink-tinged flowers in the early summer on herbaceous stems.

References

Flora of North America
Helenieae